The Ministry of Education (MoE) is a government ministry of Kiribati, headquartered in Bikenibeu, Tarawa, next to the King George V and Elaine Bernacchi School.  the ministry has about 1,400 employees.

Ministers
Roniti Teiwaki (1974–1978) for the Gilbert and Ellice Islands Colony
Teatao Teannaki (1978–1979) for Education, Training and Culture
Ieremia Tata (1979–1982, Butaritari) for Education, Training and Culture
Willie Tokataake (1994–2003)
Teima Onorio (2003–2007) also Youth and Sport Development
Maere Tekanene
David Collins (2018–2020)
Alexander Teabo (2020–)

References

External links
 Ministry of Education

Education in Kiribati
Government of Kiribati
Kiribati